One Way is a 2022 Indian Tamil-language drama film directed by M. S. Sakthivel and starring Prabanjan, Aara  and Kovai Sarala. It was released on 4 November 2022.

Cast
Prabanjan
Aara  as Selvi
Abdulla
Kovai Sarala
Charles Vinoth
Barun Chanda
Goutam Halder
Bava Chelladurai

Production
The film marked the second venture of director Sakthivel, who had previously made Maithanam (2011). The film was shot in late 2019, with writer-producer Rajathi Pandian, also taking on the lead role with the stage name of Prabanjan. The team has shot for more than 65 days in places like Munnar, Mumbai and Mount Abu. The crew has also shot for a four-day sequence in a lorry from Chennai to Mumbai, and at the 250-ft high micro tower in Munnar. North Indian actors Barun Chanda and Goutam Halder made their first appearances in Tamil cinema through the film.

Reception
The film was released on 4 November 2022 across Tamil Nadu. A critic from Ananda Vikatan gave the film a mixed review, noting that it was "partly good". A reviewer from Maalai Malar gave the film a negative review, adding that it was "unimpressive". A reviewer from the Madurai-based Thinaboomi newspaper also gave the film a negative review. Critic Malini Mannath noted "it’s a film which seems like its two halves belonged to two different plots and genres, the interlinking point giving a jerky feel".

References

External links

2022 films
2020s Tamil-language films